Niels Bagge Hansen (better known by the stage name Vinnie Who; born 1 November 1987) is a Danish indie pop and disco singer and songwriter. Who has released three albums, and is currently signed to EMI Denmark. An androgynous male singer, he sings in a distinctive high-pitched feminine voice.

Awards and nominations
In 2011, Vinnie Who was nominated for three Danish Music Awards, namely for "best Male Danish Artist", "Best Newcomer" and "Best Danish Album of the Year" for his Then I Met You album.

In popular culture
In 2013, he also served as an advisor to judge Thomas Blachman in the sixth season of the Danish X Factor music reality show .

Discography

Albums

EPs
2011: A Step

Singles

References

External links
Official; website 
Myspace
Discogs
Last.fm

1987 births
Living people
21st-century Danish  male singers